Osokin or Osokins (from осока meaning carex) is a Russian masculine surname, its feminine counterpart is Osokina. It may refer to
Andrejs Osokins (born 1984), Latvian pianist
Elena Osokina (born 1959), Russian historian 
Vladimir Osokin (born 1954), Russian Soviet cyclist

See also
Strange Life of Ivan Osokin, a novel by P. D. Ouspensky

Russian-language surnames